Dimitri Kostantinovich Simes is the former president and CEO of The Center for the National Interest, where he served from 1994 to 2022. Simes was selected to lead the Center by former President Richard Nixon, to whom he served as an informal foreign policy advisor and with whom he traveled regularly to Russia and other former Soviet states as well as Western and Central Europe.

Biography 
Simes was born in Moscow to prominent human rights lawyers in the Soviet Union. His mother, Dina Kaminskaya, was born in Yekaterinoslav and his father, Konstantin Simis, was born in Odessa, UkrSSR. In 1977, his mother was expelled from the Soviet Union for working as a lawyer for Soviet dissidents.

Simes authored a book After the Collapse: Russia Seeks its Place as a Great Power (published by Simon and Schuster).

In February 2015, Dimitri Simes met with Russian president Vladimir Putin and other Russian officials in Moscow. As publisher of The National Interest, Simes was also involved in arranging Trump's April 27, 2016, speech at the Mayflower Hotel. In the speech, Trump outlined his vision for American foreign policy and called for greater cooperation with Russia.

In September 2018, historian Yuri Felshtinsky published an article about Simes' past encounters with unregistered Russian agent Maria Butina.  

Simes resides in Washington, DC, but remotely serves as a moderator of the Moscow-based political program Big Game on Channel One Russia, together with Vyacheslav Nikonov.

Works

See also
Mueller Report
Links between Trump associates and Russian officials
Russian interference in the 2016 United States elections
Timeline of Russian interference in the 2016 United States elections
Timeline of Russian interference in the 2016 United States elections (July 2016 – election day)
Timeline of post-election transition following Russian interference in the 2016 United States elections

References

External links
 Dimitri K. Simes at the Center for the National Interest: Bio #1 Bio #2
 Entry on Dimitri K. Simes at SourceWatch
 

1947 births
Living people
People from Moscow
Moscow State University alumni
Soviet emigrants to the United States
Russian interference in the 2016 United States elections
Magazine publishers (people)